The University of California, Berkeley College of Engineering, branded as Berkeley Engineering, is the engineering school of the University of California, Berkeley, a public research university in Berkeley, California. 

Established in 1931, the college is considered one of the most prestigious and selective engineering schools in the world.
Berkeley Engineering is particularly well known for producing many successful entrepreneurs; among its alumni are co-founders and CEOs of some of the largest companies in the world, including Apple, Boeing, Google, Intel, and Tesla.

The college occupies fourteen buildings on the northeast side of the main campus and also operates the 150-acre (61 ha) Richmond Field Station. Together with the Haas School of Business, the college confers joint degrees and advises the university's resident startup incubator, Berkeley SkyDeck.

Departments 
 Aerospace Engineering
 Bioengineering (BioE)
 Civil and Environmental Engineering (CEE) 
 Development Engineering (DevEng)
 Electrical Engineering and Computer Sciences (EECS) 
 Engineering Science
 Energy Engineering
 Engineering Mathematics and Statistics (EMS)
 Engineering Physics
 Environmental Engineering Science (EES)
 Industrial Engineering and Operations Research (IEOR) 
 Materials Science and Engineering (MSE)
 Mechanical Engineering (ME) 
 Nuclear Engineering (NE)

The College of Letters and Science (L&S) also offers a Bachelor of Arts in Computer Science, which requires many of the same courses as the College of Engineering's Bachelor of Science in Electrical Engineering and Computer Science (EECS), but has different admissions and graduation criteria. It is one of the university's most selective undergraduate programs, along with the College of Engineering's EECS program; acceptance rates have been at or below 5% for both freshman and transfer applicants in recent years -- 5.2% for Fall 2020 EECS freshman applicants, 2.9% for Fall 2022 L&S CS freshman applicants, and 3.97% for 2021 L&S CS transfer applicants.  Berkeley's chemical engineering department is under the College of Chemistry.

Students 
There are approximately 4,100 undergraduates in the College of Engineering, which for the 2021-2022 application cycle had an acceptance rate of 7.6%, while Berkeley as a whole had a 14% acceptance rate.  The Management, Entrepreneurship & Technology (M.E.T.) program, a dual-degree track offered in collaboration with the Haas School of Business, is even more selective, with an acceptance rate of less than 3%. Applicants to the college may apply directly to one of the departments and enter with a declared major or may apply as an undeclared matriculant; major declaration is required at the end of sophomore year. Once within the college, it is possible to change majors with the approval of Engineering Student Services. It is extremely difficult for undergraduates in other colleges at Berkeley to transfer into Engineering, as they can only be admitted if a current engineering undergraduate drops. The college accepts transfer applications, although only 9% of the over 2,300 junior transfer applicants were admitted for the 2015–16 academic year.

Over 81% of undergraduates receive a bachelor's degree in four years, with over 90% doing so within six years.  85% of undergraduates admitted to the college graduate from the college, and 91% graduate from some college or school at Berkeley. The college has a 4-year graduation policy, with extra semesters approved only in certain cases. Engineering Student Services provides academic advising, peer tutoring, and career services to engineering students. Various student organizations are run in conjunction with the college, including Pioneers in Engineering, Hackers @ Berkeley, Berkeley Engineers and Mentors, and the Open Computing Facility. Many students belong to the student chapters of their corresponding professional organizations (e.g. the American Nuclear Society, American Society of Civil Engineers, or Institute of Electrical and Electronics Engineers).

Graduate admissions in the College of Engineering is administered by department.  During the 2021-22 academic year, the college had 2,513 graduate students and awarded 228 master's and 244 doctorate degrees as well as 889 professional master's degrees.

The college's enrollment is approximately 32% women.  Berkeley has one of the oldest, most active and most award-winning sections of the Society of Women Engineers; established in 1975, it has been recognized as a "Gold" "Outstanding Collegiate Section" for the past seven years. Among Berkeley engineering alumnae are a 2018 Nobel laureate, a 2008 Turing Award winner, a 2012 Turing Award winner, the first woman to receive a bachelor's degree in engineering from an American university, and the co-founders of Marvell Technology, Atheros Communications, and many other technology companies.

Research units
All research facilities are managed by one of five Organized Research Units (ORUs):
Earthquake Engineering Research Center - research and public safety programs against the destructive effects of earthquakes
Electronics Research Laboratory - the largest ORU; advanced research in novel areas within seven different university departments, organized into five main divisions:
Berkeley Sensor & Actuator Center
Berkeley Wireless Research Center
Berkeley Northside Research Group
Micro Systems Group
Engineering Systems Research Center - focuses on manufacturing, mechatronics, and microelectro mechanical systems (MEMS)
Institute for Environmental Science and Engineering - focuses on applying basic research to current and future environmental problems
Institute of Transportation Studies - sponsors research in transportation planning, policy analysis, environmental concerns and transportation system performance

Major research centers, institutes, and programs
Berkeley Institute for Data Science (BIDS)
Berkeley Institute of Design 
Berkeley Multimedia Research Center
Center for Human-Compatible Artificial Intelligence (CHAI)
Center for Information Technology Research in the Interest of Society (CITRIS)
Center for Intelligent Systems - developing a unified theoretical foundation for intelligent systems.
Consortium on Green Design and Manufacturing
Digital Library Project
Institute of Transportation Studies
International Computer Science Institute - basic research institute focusing on Internet architecture, speech and language processing, artificial intelligence, and cognitive and theoretical computer science
Intel Research Laboratory @ Berkeley
Integrated Materials Laboratory - facilities for research in nano-structure growth, processing, and characterization
Jacobs Institute for Design Innovation
Joint BioEnergy Institute
Microfabrication Laboratory
The Millennium Project - developing a hierarchical campus-wide "cluster of clusters" to support advanced computational applications
Nokia Research Center @ Berkeley
Pacific Earthquake Engineering Research Center
Power Systems Engineering Research Center
Simons Institute for the Theory of Computing
Simons Laufer Mathematical Sciences Institute

Notable projects 
 BSD (Berkeley Software Distribution)
 Berkeley Astrophysical CFD Results
 Berkeley Lower Extremity Exoskeleton
 Multigate device (FinFET)
 RAID (Redundant Array of Inexpensive Disks)
 SPICE (Simulation Program with Integrated Circuits Emphasis)
 RISC-V (An open Reduced Instruction Set Computing Instruction set architecture)

Notable faculty 

 Richard Karp, Turing Laureate for contributions to the field of algorithms
 William Kahan, Turing Laureate for fundamental contributions to numerical analysis
 Stuart Russell, author of Artificial Intelligence: A Modern Approach
 Ruzena Bajcsy, leader in computer vision and robotics
 Michael I. Jordan, most influential computer scientist in the world in 2016 according to Semantic Scholar  
 Lotfi Zadeh, founder of fuzzy mathematics
 Jitendra Malik, leader in computer vision and graphics
 David Patterson, Turing Laureate for contributions to computer architecture, founder of reduced instruction set computing (RISC)
 Ken Goldberg, leader in robotics
 Christos Papadimitriou, leader in complexity theory
 Eli Yablonovitch, founder of the field of photonic crystals
 Scott Shenker, leader in networking research
 Carlo H. Séquin, pioneer in processor design
 Claire J. Tomlin, leader in hybrid systems and control theory
 S. Shankar Sastry, Dean and leader in robotics and control theory
 Homayoon Kazerooni, leader in robotics
 Alice Agogino, leader in engineering diversity
 Paul K. Wright, leader in rapid prototyping
 Ashok Gadgil, environmental policy leader
 Luke Pyungse Lee, pioneer in bionanophotonics and integrated molecular diagnostics systems
 Jay Keasling, pioneer in synthetic biology
 Peidong Yang, leader in nanomaterials
 Ramamoorthy Ramesh, leader in ferroelectric materials
 Paul Alivisatos, authority on the synthesis of nanocrystals

Notable alumni 

 Steve Wozniak (BS 1986) - co-founder of Apple Inc.
 Bill Joy (MS 1979, EECS) - computer engineer and venture capitalist; co-founder of Sun Microsystems
 Eric Schmidt (MS 1975, PhD 1982) - executive chairman and former CEO of Google/Alphabet Inc. 
 Marc Tarpenning (BS 1985) - co-founder of Tesla Inc.
 Douglas Engelbart (MS 1953, PhD 1955) - founder of the field of human-computer interaction, inventor of the computer mouse
 Rube Goldberg (BS 1904) - known for Rube Goldberg machines
 Paul E. Jacobs (BS 1984, MS 1986, PhD 1989) - executive chairman of Qualcomm
 Sehat Sutardja (MS 1985, PhD 1988 EECS), Weili Dai (BA), and Pantas Sutardja (BS 1983, MS 1985, PhD 1988 EECS) - founders of Marvell Technology
 Peyman Milanfar (joint bachelor degree in mathematics and electrical engineering, 1988) - principal scientist/director at Google Research 
 Peter Norvig (PhD 1985) - director of research at Google, co-author of Artificial Intelligence: A Modern Approach
 Andrew Ng (PhD 2002) - co-founder and executive chairman at Coursera, chief scientist at Baidu
 Craig Federighi (BS 1991, MS CS 1993) - senior vice president of software engineering at Apple Inc.
 Eleven Turing Laureate Alumni (most of any school) -- Barbara Liskov, Butler Lampson, Charles P. Thacker, Dana Scott, Douglas Engelbart, Jim Gray, Ken Thompson, Leonard Adleman, Niklaus Wirth, Shafi Goldwasser, Silvio Micali

Student organizations 
Eta Kappa Nu (HKN)
Pioneers in Engineering
 Out in Science, Technology, Engineering, Mathematics
 Design for America
 Society of Women Engineers
 BESSA
 Robotics @ Berkeley
 Machine Learning @ Berkeley 
 Mobile Developers of Berkeley

See also
 List of engineering schools
 List of University of California, Berkeley alumni
 List of University of California, Berkeley faculty

References

External links

University of California, Berkeley
Engineering universities and colleges in California
Educational institutions established in 1931
Science and technology in the San Francisco Bay Area
1931 establishments in California